Tanichthys kuehnei is a species of freshwater fish. It is a member of the carp family (family Cyprinidae) of order Cypriniformes.  It is native to Central Vietnam.

The specific name honours the German aquarist Jens Kühne who tried to locate this species in the field.

References 

kuehnei
Fish described in 2018
Fish of Vietnam